Eusebio Alfredo Acasuzo Colán (born 8 April 1952) is a retired Peruvian professional football goalkeeper.

Career
At club level, he played for Universitario de Deportes in Peru. Later, he played for Club Bolívar. Acasuzo made 30 appearances for the Peru national football team. He was a playing member of Peru's squad at the 1982 FIFA World Cup.

References

External links

1952 births
Living people
Footballers from Lima
Association football goalkeepers
Peruvian footballers
Peru international footballers
1982 FIFA World Cup players
1975 Copa América players
Copa América-winning players
Unión Huaral footballers
Club Universitario de Deportes footballers
Club Bolívar players
Peruvian Primera División players
Peruvian expatriate footballers
Expatriate footballers in Bolivia
Peruvian expatriate sportspeople in Bolivia
1983 Copa América players